Ernst Lörtscher (15 March 1913 – 30 November 1993) was a Swiss footballer. He played for Servette Genf and the Switzerland national football team, for whom he appeared in the 1938 FIFA World Cup, during which he would become the second player in the Event's history to score an own goal. This distinction occurred during Switzerland's 4–2 replay match victory against Nazi Germany on 9 June.

References

1913 births
1993 deaths
Footballers from Bucharest
Swiss men's footballers
Servette FC players
1938 FIFA World Cup players
Switzerland international footballers
Association football midfielders